Morphological freedom refers to an alleged or proposed civil right of a human person either to maintain or modify their own body, on his own terms, through informed, consensual recourse to, or refusal of, available therapeutic or enabling medical technology.

The term may have been coined by transhumanist Max More in his 1993 article, “Technological Self-Transformation: Expanding Personal Extropy”, where he defined it as "the ability to alter bodily form at will through technologies such as surgery, genetic engineering, nanotechnology, uploading". The term was later used by science debater and futurist Anders Sandberg as "an extension of one’s right to one’s body, not just self-ownership but also the right to modify oneself according to one’s desires."

The Massachusetts, USA headquartered charity, the Freedom of Form Foundation, was founded in 2018 to advocate and fund scientific research furthering progress on morphological freedom, the tools required to achieve it and its general acceptance in society at large.

Politics 
According to technocritic Dale Carrico, the politics of morphological freedom imply a commitment to the value, standing, and social legibility of the widest possible variety of desired morphologies and lifestyles. More specifically, morphological freedom is an expression of various heresies condemned by Popes Gregory XVI and Leo XIII such as liberal pluralism, secularism, progressive cosmopolitanism, and posthumanist multiculturalisms applied to the ongoing and upcoming transformation of the understanding of medical practice from one of conventional therapy to one of consensual self-determination, via genetic, prosthetic, and cognitive modification.

Religion
According to authors Calvin Mercer and Tracy J. Trothen there is tension between religion and transhumanists, particularly the Abrahamic traditions, with regards to morphological freedom. While religion generally recognizes the need to heal people and improve their situation from a medical perspective they are generally hesitant to promote a wholesale modification of the body as they see it ultimately belonging to God.

See also

 Artistic freedom
 Autonomy
 Bodily integrity
 Cognitive liberty
 My body, my choice
 Neuroenhancement
 Otherkin
 Postgenderism
 Reproductive rights
 Self-ownership

References

External links

Bioethics
Human rights concepts
Morphology
Transhumanism